Nigeria is the most heavily populated and one of the most economically developed nations on the African continent. However, the concentration of high-rise buildings and ongoing mega-projects is significantly localized around Lagos, Abuja and Eko Atlantic; these key marginal cities have experienced rapid growth recently. At , The Nigerian External Communications (NECOM) building is the tallest building in Nigeria, with a total of 32 floors.

Tallest buildings
This includes spires and architectural details but does not include antenna masts.

Tallest under construction, approved and proposed

Under construction, approved, and proposed

See also

 List of tallest buildings in Africa
 List of tallest buildings in the world

References

Tallest
Nigeria
Nigeria